Ephedra may refer to:

 Ephedra (medicine), a medicinal preparation from the plant Ephedra sinica 
 Ephedra (plant), genus of gymnosperm shrubs

See also 

 Ephedrine